Nigar Kocharli (born 15 October 1975) is the CEO and owner of the Ali and Nino bookstore chain and publishing house, and founder of the National Book Award of Azerbaijan.

Kocharli graduated from Baku State University and was part of the mathematics faculty between 1993 and 1997.

Kocharli worked for several companies and projects after graduation, including the United Nations Development Programme Community Empowerment Project up until 2001. In that year she started a business, establishing Ali and Nino, which is the now the largest bookstore chain in Azerbaijan. The chain is named after the novel Ali and Nino. Soon after opening the bookstores, she founded the National Book Award, aiming to promote modern Azerbaijani literature and support local authors.

Kocharli also established an online bookstore selling books in Azerbaijani, Turkish, Russian and English, as well as founding Ali and Nino Publishing House, which translates and publishes classics and contemporary literature, including the novels of Khalid Hosseini.

In 2018, Kocharli alleged that a government minister was compelling her to sell her bookstore chain.

Kocharli is married and has one daughter.

References

External links 
 Official website

1975 births
Businesspeople from Baku
Booksellers (people)
Living people